Derby Turn was a football and athletics stadium in Burton upon Trent in England. It was the home ground of Burton Wanderers, who played in the Football League during the mid-1890s, and was also used to host athletics meetings.

History
The ground was built on a site between Derby Road and the parallel railway line to the north of Burton town centre. The ground's record attendance was set on 10 February 1894 for an FA Cup match between Burton Wanderers and Notts County. Temporary stands were erected for the match, which Notts County won 2–1. The highest attendance for a Football League match was 5,000 for a Burton derby game between Wanderers and Burton Swifts on 25 December 1896, with Wanderers winning the game 1–0.

In 1901 Wanderers and Swifts merged to form Burton United, with the new club playing at Swifts' Peel Croft ground. Most of the Derby Road site was bought by Midland Railway to extend the Dixie sidings.

References

Defunct football venues in England
Buildings and structures in Burton upon Trent
Sports venues in Staffordshire
English Football League venues
Sport in Burton upon Trent